Jabu Mabuza (4 February 1958 – 16 June 2021) was a South African businessman and investor. He was chairman of the Eskom board.

He was appointed the chairman of Eskom in January 2018.

Early life and education
Jabulane Mabuza was born in February 1958 in the town of Waterval Boven, South Africa. His family was later forcibly resettled in White River on trust land, and Mabuza lived alternatively with his two grandmothers. He later went to live with an aunt in Daveyton. While in junior secondary school, Mabuza was expelled for being caught in the 1976 student protests in Soweto. He graduated in Durban and from 1981 until 1982 attended the University of Limpopo.

Career
In 1980 he became a clerk of the court at what was then called the Department of Bantu Affairs. He began driving taxis for tuition funds while in Daveyton, later becoming a taxi owner. Also in the late 1980s he helped found the Foundation for African Business and Consumer Services, becoming the organization's CEO in 1990.

Mabuza was the group CEO of Tsogo Sun Holding.

On 20 January 2018, South Africa's President Cyril Ramaphosa appointed Mabuza as the new chairman of Eskom, a state-owned power utility company.

On 29 July 2019, Jabu Mabuza was appointed Acting CEO of ESKOM, replacing the resigned Phakamani Hadebe at the struggling State Energy utility.

Personal life
Mabuza met his future wife, Siphiwe, in the 1970s while on a train to Durban. They had three children. He died of COVID-19 on 16 June 2021, aged 63.

References

1958 births
2021 deaths
South African businesspeople
People from Emakhazeni Local Municipality
Deaths from the COVID-19 pandemic in South Africa